Montreux '75 is a 1975 live album by the American jazz singer Ella Fitzgerald, accompanied by a trio led by the pianist Tommy Flanagan.

It is one of four albums that Ella recorded at the Montreux Jazz Festival, and it was Ella's first appearance at Montreux to be released on record. It provides a perfect snapshot of her concert repertoire and voice at this stage in her career, with familiar Fitzgerald material from Cole Porter, Duke Ellington, and songs from her upcoming album Ella Abraça Jobim.

Track listing
 "Caravan" (Duke Ellington, Irving Mills, Juan Tizol) – 2:20 
 "Satin Doll" (Ellington, Johnny Mercer, Billy Strayhorn) – 2:37 
 "Teach Me Tonight" (Sammy Cahn, Gene DePaul) – 4:27
 "Wave" (Antônio Carlos Jobim) – 5:02
 "It's All Right With Me" (Cole Porter) – 2:49 
 "Let's Do It, Let's Fall in Love" (Porter) – 5:29 
 "How High the Moon" (Nancy Hamilton, Morgan Lewis) – 6:20 
 "The Girl from Ipanema" (Vinícius de Moraes, Norman Gimbel, Jobim) – 6:49
 "'Tain't Nobody's Bizness If I Do" (Porter Grainger, Everett Robbins) – 5:42

Personnel
Recorded July 17, 1975, in Montreux, Switzerland:

 Ella Fitzgerald - Vocals
 Tommy Flanagan Trio:
 Tommy Flanagan - Piano
 Keter Betts - Bass
 Bobby Durham - Drums

References

Ella Fitzgerald live albums
Albums produced by Norman Granz
Albums recorded at the Montreux Jazz Festival
1975 live albums
Pablo Records live albums